Daduchos or Daduchus, or Dadouchos ("torch-bearer", from δᾶις+ἔχω) is an epithet of Artemis, and notably of Demeter seeking her lost daughter (Persephone) with a torch. It was also an epithet of Hekate, a goddess frequently associated with torches. This title was given in the Rhodes Island in Greece.
It was also the title of the second priest (ranking after the Hierophant) at the Eleusinian Mysteries, an office inherited in several families of Athens.

References

Sources
Eleusis By Karl Kerényi Archetypal Image of Mother and Daughter  Page 78 

Eleusinian Mysteries
Epithets of Artemis
Epithets of Demeter
Ancient Athenian religious titles
Ancient Greek priests